The Confederation of Christian Trade Unions (or ACV; , CSC) is the largest of Belgium's three trade union federations.

History
The federation was founded in 1904, but can trace its origins to the "Anti-Socialist Cotton Workers' Union" founded in 1886. The organisation took its current name in 1923.

Today the ACV/CSC has 22 regional federation and 16 sectoral unions, with a membership of 1.7 million (almost 16% of the total Belgian population). The president is currently  and the secretary general is Marie-Hélène Ska.

Affiliates
The union's affiliates are:

Former affiliates

Leadership

Presidents
1912: Gustaaf Eylenbosch
1914: Hendrik Heyman
1919: René Debruyne
1921: Evarist Van Quaquebeke
1923: René Debruyne
1932: Henri Pauwels
1946: August Cool
1968: Jef Houthuys
1987: Willy Peirens
1999: Luc Cortebeeck
2012: Marc Leemans

General Secretaries
1912: Georges Rutten
1919: Evarist Van Quaquebeke
1921: Henri Pauwels
1932: August Cool
1946: Louis Dereau
1973: Robert D'Hondt
1991: Josly Piette
2006: Claude Rolin
2014: Marie-Hélène Ska

See also

 Het Volk (newspaper)

References

Sources

External links

 Confederation of Christian Trade Unions in ODIS - Online Database for Intermediary Structures
 Archives of Confederation of Christian Trade Unions in ODIS - Online Database for Intermediary Structures

Christian organizations established in 1904
Trade unions in Belgium
International Trade Union Confederation
European Trade Union Confederation
Trade Union Advisory Committee to the OECD
Christian denominations established in the 20th century
Belgium
1904 establishments in Belgium
Trade unions established in 1904
Catholic trade unions